The Sungkai railway station is a Malaysian train station stationed at the north eastern side of and named after the town of Sungkai, Perak, Malaysia.

The station was reopened and electrified in March 2007 as part of the double tracking project between Rawang and Ipoh.  At one end of this station, there is a freight yard. It was made prior to the Rawang-Ipoh Electrified Double Tracking Project.

Location and locality 
This station is located in Taman Permai Jaya, Sungkai, in Batang Padang district of Perak, Malaysia and is very close to Sungkai town. It is accessible directly via junction to the station at Route A189 which stretch between FELDA Besout estates, Changkat Sulaiman and Sungkai town. It is also easy to access from Federal Route 1 main road via junction to Sungkai town. 

Other than Sungkai, the station also serves Bidor town, another main town in Batang Padang since Bidor don't have a station of their own anymore and this station is the nearest alternative the town has. It is also near to Kuala Bikam town.

External links
 Sungkai Railway Station

Batang Padang District
KTM ETS railway stations
Railway stations in Perak